Central University may mean:
Central university (India), one of government-designated universities in India
Central University (Colombia), a university in Colombia
National Central University, Taiwan (between 1928 and 1949 in mainland China)
Nanjing University, former name
Central University of Ecuador, a university in Ecuador
Central University of Chile, a private university in Chile
Central Philippine University
Manila Central University, Philippines
Central University (Richmond, Kentucky), merged with Centre College Danville, Kentucky, in 1901.
Central University (Ghana), a university in Ghana
Central College (Iowa), former name

See also
Central College (disambiguation)
Central State (disambiguation)